Nicola Morris (born 13 March 1962) is an English former middle and long-distance runner. After winning the 1989 AAA Indoor Championships 3000 metres title, she went on to win a silver medal in the 3000m at the 1989 European Indoor Championships, and to finish fifth at the 1989 World Indoor Championships.

International competitions

References

1962 births
Living people
English female long-distance runners
English female middle-distance runners
Athletes (track and field) at the 1990 Commonwealth Games
Commonwealth Games competitors for England